The Church of Croatian Martyrs is a Roman Catholic church in Čavoglave, Šibenik-Knin County, Croatia. The church was designed by Gorana Banić and Emil Šverko (between 2003 and 2007).

History
The cornerstone for the church was laid in 2004 by Ante Ivas, Bishop of Šibenik. Croatian singer Marko Perković, who was born in Čavoglave, aided with funding of the construction of the church. It was completed in 2010. On 9 October of the same year, the church bells were blessed by Ivas. The church has three bells, which were cast in workshop "Grass Mayer" in Innsbruck.

The first bell, weighing 450 kilos, is dedicated to Aloysius Stepinac. The second bell, weighing 250 kilos, is dedicated to St. Elijah. The third bell, weighing 130 kilos, is dedicated to St. Michael and St. Benedict.

References

Churches in Croatia
Roman Catholic churches completed in 2010
Buildings and structures in Šibenik-Knin County